The 2006 Cincinnati Masters (also known as the Western & Southern Financial Group Masters and Western & Southern Financial Group Women's Open for sponsorship reasons) was a tennis tournament played on outdoor hard courts. It was the 105th edition of the Cincinnati Masters, and was part of the ATP Masters Series of the 2006 ATP Tour, and of the Tier III Series of the 2006 WTA Tour. Both the men's and the women's events took place at the Lindner Family Tennis Center in Mason, near Cincinnati, Ohio, United States, with the men playing from August 14 through August 21, 2006, and the women from July 17 through July 23, 2006.

The men's singles were led by World No. 1, Australian Open and Wimbledon and 2006 U.S. Open champion, and 6-times Masters Series finalist in 2006, Roger Federer, French Open winner Rafael Nadal, and ATP No. 3. Other players competing included Nikolay Davydenko, David Nalbandian, Andy Murray and home favourites Andy Roddick and James Blake.

Finals

Men's singles

 Andy Roddick defeated  Juan Carlos Ferrero 6–3, 6–4
It was only Andy Roddick's 1st title of the year, but his 21st overall. It was his 1st Masters title of the year, his 4th overall, and his 2nd win at the event, after 2003.

Women's singles

 Vera Zvonareva defeated  Katarina Srebotnik 6–2, 6–4
It was Vera Zvonareva's 3rd title of the year, and her 8th overall.

Men's doubles

 Jonas Björkman /  Max Mirnyi defeated  Bob Bryan /  Mike Bryan 3–6, 6–3, [10–7]

Women's doubles

 Maria Elena Camerin /  Gisela Dulko defeated  Marta Domachowska /  Sania Mirza 6–4, 3–6, 6–2

External links

 
 Association of Tennis Professionals (ATP) tournament profile
 Men's Singles draw
 Men's Doubles draw
 Women's Singles, Doubles and Qualifying draws

 
Western and Southern Financial Group Masters
Western and Southern Financial Group Women's Open
Cincinnati Masters
Cincinnati Masters
Western and Southern Financial Group Masters